Geoff Molyneux (born 23 January 1943) is an English former footballer who played as a winger.

Playing career
The younger brother of Liverpool and Chester defender John Molyneux, Geoff joined Chester as an amateur from Rylands Youth Club in Warrington in 1962. He made his only appearance in The Football League in a 3–1 win over Exeter City (with John also in the side) on 22 September 1962, also playing in a Football League Cup tie with Mansfield Town four days later.

He did not make any more first-team appearances for Chester and quickly dropped into the Cheshire County League with New Brighton.

References

1943 births
Living people
Footballers from Warrington
English footballers
English Football League players
Association football wingers
Chester City F.C. players
New Brighton A.F.C. players